David Philip Brabham (born 5 September 1965) is an Australian professional racing driver and one of the most successful and experienced specialists in sports car racing. Brabham won the American Le Mans Series in 2009 and 2010. He also competed in Formula One, racing for the Brabham and Simtek teams in 1990 and 1994, respectively. Brabham is the youngest son of three-time Formula One world champion Sir Jack Brabham, brother to Geoff Brabham and Gary Brabham. He is also brother-in-law to Mike Thackwell, father to Sam Brabham and uncle to Matthew Brabham.

Early life
Brabham, who was born in Wimbledon, London, spent his childhood in Australia. Despite his father's motor racing fame he took little interest in motor racing until after he left school. As a child he played soccer up until the age of twelve and then took up Australian rules football when the family moved to Sydney. Growing up, Sir Jack did not force David into racing, and it was only after discovering go-karts at 17, that he became enthusiastic enough to purchase a second-hand go-kart with his next-door neighbour and to begin racing.

Motor racing career

Early career
Brabham's professional racing career began in Australia in 1983, racing karts for two years, after which he moved into the Ford Laser "one make" series for 1985. In 1986 he switched to Formula Ford 1600 and subsequently to Australian Formula 2, winning the 1987 Australian Drivers' Championship in that category. The 1987 ADC was, unlike previous years, only held as a single race rather than a series of rounds and was run as a support category to the 1987 Australian Grand Prix in Adelaide. After starting 38th on the grid due to carburettor and electrical problems with his Ralt RT30 Volkswagen in qualifying, he caught and passed leader Rohan Onslow on lap 13 of the 15 lap race and went on to a 1.7 second victory.

He also competed in the New Zealand Formula Atlantic series, the American Formula Atlantic series and in the South American Formula 3 Championship during the 1987 season. A move from Australia to Europe under sponsorship from Camel in 1989 saw him joining the Bowman team and winning the British Formula Three Championship.

Formula One career
He had raised a considerable amount of sponsorship to join the team bearing his family name (though it had been sold on three times since) but financial constraints hindered the team all season. While David had been hired to drive ahead of the season he requested to skip the first two races to prepare himself, Gregor Foitek taking the seat instead. Ironically his brother Gary attempted to qualify for the first two rounds in the ill-fated Life before quitting; the brothers therefore both contested the 1990 season without actually entering any of the same meetings.

His first outing with the team was the 1990 San Marino Grand Prix where he failed to qualify. His first Formula One start came at the next race in Monaco where his father Jack had won in 1959, his first championship year. In 14 races he only managed to qualify the uncompetitive Judd-engined car six times, including the last race of the year at home in Australia. This, and David being unable to raise the reported $3m needed to keep his place in the team, led to him being replaced at the end of the season. Brabham joined the Tom Walkinshaw Racing Jaguar team in 1991 and also in that year won the Spa 24 Hours driving a Nissan Skyline R32 GT-R alongside Naoki Hattori and the late Anders Olofsson.

The second seat was to be filled by paying drivers, with Roland Ratzenberger taking the first five races before Jean-Marc Gounon took over. The S941 chassis was overweight, used a fully manual gearbox as opposed to the semi-automatic types used by most teams and inferior wire-spring Cosworth HB customer engines. Despite this Brabham qualified for every round of the series.
The team suffered the blow of the death of Roland Ratzenberger during qualifying for the San Marino Grand Prix. Traditionally the other team driver would withdraw in such a situation, but seeing the demoralisation around him, Brabham decided to race on, only to crash out after a suspension failure of his own. In Ratzenberger's memory the team made a collective decision to see out the season, with Brabham's strong leadership often cited as a key factor. While the Simtek was uncompetitive he won considerable acclaim for his determination and for gradually improving the speed of the underfunded package, also handily out-performing his various teammates.

Touring Cars
Brabham quit Formula One at the end of that year to begin touring car racing – while he wanted to help Simtek the salary offered by the BMW works team was too good to ignore. 1995 in a BTCC BMW was not a success, but subsequent successes included winning the 1996 JGTC GT500 championship in McLaren F1 GTR (so far the only non-Japanese team car to win this), and the 1997 AMP Bathurst 1000 in its Super Touring era. Driving a BMW 320i at Bathurst with brother Geoff, the pair were flagged in 2nd but were elevated to the win soon after the finish when their BMW Motorsport Australia teammates Paul Morris and Craig Baird were disqualified, the team making an error at the last pit stop by not doing a driver change and leaving Baird in the car for the run home, not realising that he would exceed his allowed driving time before the race ended.

He won the Professional Sports Car Championship in the United States with the Panoz racing team in 1998, and the 1999 Petit Le Mans race also with Panoz.

GT racing
Brabham joined Sumo Power GT for the 2011 FIA GT1 World Championship, teaming with Jamie Campbell-Walter in a Nissan GT-R. The duo finished 10th in the driver's championship. He will join the Blancpain Endurance Series in 2012, driving a McLaren MP4-12C for United Autosports.

Sports car racing

Since 1999 he has been a regular in the American Le Mans Series (ALMS), having raced for teams such as Panoz and Prodrive Ferrari 550 Maranello. He won the Sebring 12-hour race in 2005. In Australia, he has contested the Bathurst 24 Hour race and continued to make occasional appearances in the Bathurst 1000.

Brabham has won a total of 23 ALMS events across all four classes in the series. He is a two-time champion in the series, winning the LMP1 title in 2009 and LMP title in 2010.

In 2003, Brabham won first-in-class (4th overall) with Multimatic Motorsports at the 24 Hours of Daytona, the Daytona Prototype category's inaugural race. Brabham finished second at the 2003 24 Hours of Le Mans driving for Bentley. In 2005 he started the first of four consecutive Le Mans starts racing Aston Martin DBR9's. He finished ninth overall and third in the GT1 Class for Aston Martin Racing. At the 2006 24 Hours of Le Mans, Brabham scored a fourth in the GT1 category (ninth overall) driving for Russian Age Racing. Brabham won the GT1 class of the 2007 24 Hours of Le Mans and again in the 2008 24 Hours of Le Mans driving for Aston Martin Racing.

Driving for Peugeot, he won the 2009 24 Hours of Le Mans outright with co-drivers Alexander Wurz and Marc Gené driving a Peugeot 908 HDi FAP. He joined brother Geoff as a Le Mans winner with his older brother having also won for Peugeot in 1993. It also saw him join his father and older brother as an outright winner at Le Mans with father Jack having won the only French Grand Prix held at the Bugatti Circuit in 1967.

David Brabham became only the fourth Australian driver to win the 24 Hours of Le Mans following Bernard Rubin in 1928, Vern Schuppan in 1983, and older brother Geoff in 1993.

Brabham won the 2009 and 2010 American Le Mans Series LMP championship, driving for Highcroft Racing. For 2012, he will compete in the FIA World Endurance Championship in a JRM Racing Honda Performance Development ARX-03a.

Project Brabham
In the Autumn of 2014, Project Brabham was announced as an innovative and new way of setting up a motor racing team. The project is aimed at integrating the public and fans with the team. The initial start-up of the project was run via crowdfunding through the Indiegogo portal, where members of the public and fans alike could become part of the team.

″The money from the first phase of crowdfunding has been used to build this first stage Brabham-Digital website. We also created the all-important investor prospectus, which is vital in searching for and securing the investment required to build and launch both the team and Brabham-Digital platform"

The project is still gathering much needed investment to get the team onto the track with the aim to become part of the FIA World Endurance championship.

"Our complete focus is now on finding and signing the investors and partners that will be vital in securing the investment required to make this vision a reality. When that investment is secured, the full Brabham-Digital platform will be developed and built, evolving into a much more engaging and powerful engine, divided into the three different knowledge sharing and e-learning platforms."

Brabham Automotive

Brabham launched Brabham Automotive in May 2018. Its first product is the Brabham BT62. Brabham drove the car on its racing debut at Brands Hatch on the 9th and 10th of November, participating in Britcar's annual 'Into the Night' races. He was joined in the car by Will Powell. He drove the car home to victory at Brands Hatch as a remarkable win, the Brabham BT62's first ever race and win and Brabham Automotive's first car and win. In a post-race interview he referred to his father's win at the 1966 British Grand Prix who won in a Brabham BT19.

Family
Brabham's two older brothers Geoff and Gary also pursued motor racing careers. His wife Lisa (sister of Mike Thackwell) also raced. His son Sam Brabham and nephew Matthew Brabham now race in junior formulae.

Racing record

Career summary

Complete Formula One results
(key)

Complete International Formula 3000 results
(key) (Races in bold indicate pole position) (Races in italics indicate fastest lap)

12 Hours of Sebring results

24 Hours of Le Mans results

Complete British Touring Car Championship results
(key) (Races in bold indicate pole position) (Races in italics indicate fastest lap)

Complete Super Tourenwagen Cup results
(key) (Races in bold indicate pole position) (Races in italics indicate fastest lap)

Complete JGTC results
(key) (Races in bold indicate pole position) (Races in italics indicate fastest lap)

Complete GT1 World Championship results

Complete FIA World Endurance Championship results

‡ As Brabham was a guest driver, he was ineligible for championship points.

WeatherTech SportsCar Championship results
(key)(Races in bold indicate pole position, Results are overall/class)

Complete Bathurst 1000 results

* Super Touring race

Spa 24 Hours results

Bathurst 24 Hour results

Complete Britcar results
(key) (Races in bold indicate pole position in class – 1 point awarded just in first race; races in italics indicate fastest lap in class – 1 point awarded all races;-

† Brabham was ineligible for points as he was an invitation entry.

References

External links

 
 

1965 births
Living people
David
Sportsmen from New South Wales
Racing drivers from Sydney
24 Hours of Le Mans drivers
24 Hours of Le Mans winning drivers
Atlantic Championship drivers
Australian Formula One drivers
Bathurst 1000 winners
Brabham Formula One drivers
British Formula Three Championship drivers
British Touring Car Championship drivers
FIA GT Championship drivers
International Formula 3000 drivers
Simtek Formula One drivers
American Le Mans Series drivers
European Le Mans Series drivers
Supercars Championship drivers
FIA GT1 World Championship drivers
Australian Formula 2 drivers
World Sportscar Championship drivers
FIA World Endurance Championship drivers
Blancpain Endurance Series drivers
24 Hours of Daytona drivers
WeatherTech SportsCar Championship drivers
24 Hours of Spa drivers
Sports car racing team owners
Britcar drivers
DAMS drivers
United Autosports drivers
Aston Martin Racing drivers
Nismo drivers
Multimatic Motorsports drivers
Extreme Speed Motorsports drivers
Schnitzer Motorsport drivers
David Price Racing drivers
TOM'S drivers
Peugeot Sport drivers
Long Distance Series drivers
Australian Endurance Championship drivers
BMW M drivers
Jaguar Racing drivers
Highcroft Racing drivers
Stone Brothers Racing drivers
Dick Johnson Racing drivers